Dilshod Juraev (born 21 April 1992) is an Uzbekistani professional footballer who plays as a defensive midfielder for Uzbekistan Super League club Qizilqum Zarafshon, and the Uzbekistan national team.

Career

He was called up for 2015 AFC Asian Cup qualification match on 15 November 2013 against Vietnam.

International goals
Scores and results list Uzbekistan's goal tally first.

Honors
Bunyodkor
 Uzbek League: 2011, 2013
 Uzbek Cup: 2012, 2013
 Uzbekistan Super Cup: 2014

References

External links

1992 births
Living people
Uzbekistani footballers
Uzbekistan international footballers
Association football defenders
Association football midfielders
FK Dinamo Samarqand players
Place of birth missing (living people)
Footballers at the 2014 Asian Games
Uzbekistan Super League players
Asian Games competitors for Uzbekistan